"Eye of the Storm" is a song recorded by Christian musician Ryan Stevenson for his 2015 studio album Fresh Start. It peaked at number one on both the Billboard Hot Christian Songs and Christian Airplay charts, his first single to reach such feat.

Charts

Certifications

References

2015 songs
2016 singles
Gotee Records singles
Contemporary Christian songs